Neelyton is an unincorporated community in Huntingdon County, Pennsylvania, United States. Neelyton has a post office with ZIP code 17239.

References

Unincorporated communities in Huntingdon County, Pennsylvania
Unincorporated communities in Pennsylvania